Majiang may refer to:

Majiang County (麻江), Qiandongnan Prefecture, Guizhou, China
Majiang, Zhaoping County (马江镇), town in Guangxi, China
Majiang, Chaling County (马江镇), town in Hunan, China
 Majiang, Shuangpai (麻江镇), a town Shuangpai County, Hunan
Mahjong (麻将), a game which is popular in east Asia, especially in Mainland China
Guobiao Majiang, a rule of Mahjong founded by All-China Sports Federation